Manuel Rebollo García (born 2 July 1945) is a Spanish Navy admiral. He became Chief of the Naval Staff  on 18 July 2008. Admiral Jaime Muñoz-Delgado replaced him on 27 July de 2012.

References

1945 births
Chiefs of Staff of the Navy (Spain)
Living people
People from Vega Baja del Segura
Spanish admirals